Mueller Water Products, Inc. (MWP) is a publicly traded company headquartered in Atlanta, Georgia. It is one of the largest manufacturers and distributors of fire hydrants, gate valves, and other water infrastructure products in North America. MWP is made up of two business units—Mueller Co. and Mueller Technologies—that oversee more than a dozen brands and affiliates, including Echologics and Mueller Systems.

History
Mueller Water Products was incorporated as a standalone business on September 22, 2005, but the company traces the history of its business units, subsidiaries and brands back as far as 1857, when the forerunner to Mueller Co. was founded by Hieronymus Mueller in Decatur, Illinois. Providence Steam and Gas Pipe became General Fire Extinguisher Co. in 1892 after merging with several sprinkler manufacturers, and was later renamed Grinnell Co. in 1919, after the company's president, Frederick Grinnell. In 1899, 12 companies incorporated as United States Cast Iron Pipe and Foundry Company, which would later be known as U.S. Pipe after dropping "cast iron" from the company name in 1929. Grinnell Co. became known as Anvil International in 2000.

Jim Walter Corporation acquired U.S. Pipe in 1969, and in 2005, it acquired Mueller Co. and Anvil International. The three businesses were combined to form Mueller Water Products.  The combined entity was then spun off as the publicly held Mueller Water Products, Inc. in 2006, moving its headquarters from the company's birthplace of Decatur, Illinois, to Atlanta, Georgia. Initially, MWP operated with three business units—Mueller Co., Anvil International, and U.S. Pipe. However, in 2012 Mueller Water Products divested U.S. Pipe to Wynnchurch Capital, Ltd., retaining only the valve and hydrant division, which now operates under the Mueller Co. business unit. Early in 2017 Mueller Water Products sold its Anvil International division to One Equity Partners and also completed the acquisition of Singer Valve, a manufacturer of automatic control valves.

Organization

Structure
Mueller Water Products is a publicly traded company governed by a board of 10 directors, including former Atlanta Mayor Shirley Franklin. It is divided into two Reporting Segments— Infrastructure Products and Technologies Products. Each of these units oversees several related brands and subsidiaries.

Mueller Co.
Mueller Co. is one of the largest North American manufacturers of valves and fire hydrants. It oversees several brands and subsidiaries that specialize in valves, fittings, utility meters, water infrastructure, leak detection, and pipe condition assessment.

Sustainability
MWP is the only manufacturer of valves and hydrants that utilizes the lost-foam casting process, which reduces the amount of required materials for casting and reduces the amount of waste and emissions generated by the casting process.  Mueller Co. offers all of its waterworks brass products in low-lead varieties. MWP utilizes Key Performance Indicators (KPIs) and establish KPI targets in order to track and drive sustainability results. They track performance KPIs in Energy, Water Conservation, Gas, and Solid Waste. MWP is also a member of the U.S. Green Building Council. and the EPA's Energy Star program.

References

Manufacturing companies based in Georgia (U.S. state)
American companies established in 1857
Manufacturing companies established in 1857
Companies listed on the New York Stock Exchange
1857 establishments in Illinois